Andrew John Ross is a family medicine specialist at UKZN, and is the founder and a trustee of Umthombo Youth Development Foundation (UYDF) which has produced more than 135 graduates in 16 different health science disciplines.

Early life 
Ross was born in South Africa to Christian parents who were both medical doctors working as missionaries in South Africa, Nigeria and Ethiopia. He grew up in these countries and went to boarding school in the UK before returning home to South Africa. As a result of his childhood in several African countries and his boarding school experience, he acquired a strong appreciation of cultural differences and developed his ability to empathize with others. Upon returning to South Africa, his father became a professor at the University of KwaZulu-Natal, which at the time had a good quality faculty of medicine that would train black students.

Medical work 
After various public hospital postings as a junior doctor until 1990, Ross worked as the senior medical officer at the Mosvold Hospital in rural Kwa-Zulu Natal.

He is presently the Principal Specialist in Family Medicine at the medical school at UKZN.

Awards 

Ross was listed as a Lead South African Hero for his role in nurturing youngsters from rural KwaZulu-Natal into professional health scientists. In 2014, Ross was elected as a fellow of the Ashoka Fellowship. On 27 April 2015, Ross was awarded the Order of the Baobab  in the silver class.

Publications

Notes and references

External links 
Staff profile at UKZN

South African general practitioners
Order of the Baobab
Year of birth missing (living people)
Living people
Academic staff of the University of KwaZulu-Natal
Place of birth missing (living people)